California is a 1963 American Western film directed by Hamil Petroff and starring Jock Mahoney and Faith Domergue.

Plot
Revolutionaries rise up against the Mexican government in California in 1841. Mexican general Don Francisco Hernandez pits his troops against a tenacious team of revolutionaries led by his half-brother Don Michael O'Casey. Marianna De La Rosa is an heiress pledged to marry Don Francisco although she secretly loves Don Michael.

Cast
 Jock Mahoney as Don Michael O'Casey
 Faith Domergue as Carlotta Torres
 Michael Pate as Don Francisco Hernandez
 Susan Seaforth Hayes as Marianna De La Rosa (as Susan Seaforth)
 Rodolfo Hoyos Jr. as Padre Soler (as Rodolfo Hoyos)
 Penny Santon as Dona Ana Sofia Hicenta
 Jimmy Murphy as Jacinto
 Nestor Paiva as Gen. Micheltorena
 Roberto Contreras as Lt. Sanchez (as Roberto Contreres)
 Felix Locher as Don Pablo Hernandez
 Charles Horvath as Manuel

Production
The film was shot on the old Republic lot. The sword fight at the end was director Hamil Petroff's last-minute idea and it did not appear in the original script.

See also
 List of American films of 1963

References

External links

1963 films
American International Pictures films
Films set in California
American black-and-white films
1963 Western (genre) films
Films set in the 1840s
American historical films
1960s historical films
1960s English-language films
Films scored by Richard LaSalle
1960s American films